The Strategic Reconnaissance Command ( or) is the central headquarter for military intelligence of German Bundeswehr, based in Gelsdorf.

The KSA was founded in January 2002 as a central command of all  military intelligence abilities of Bundeswehr. Before that military intelligence where separated in the military branches (Air Force, Army, Navy). The capabilities include "satellite-based imaging reconnaissance" (SARLupe), "telecommunications and electronic reconnaissance", electronic warfare, area of "object analysis" and operative communication.

The command works closely with the Federal Intelligence Service (BND). For military counterintelligence the Military Counterintelligence Service (MAD) is responsible. The KSA is also responsible for the joint development of military intelligence and training.

Since July 2017 the KSA is under the command of the new formed Cyber and Information Domain Service (Kommando Cyber- und Informationsraum).

Organisation 
  Strategic Reconnaissance Command ( KSA), in Gelsdorf
  911th Electronic Warfare Battalion
  912th Electronic Warfare Battalion, mans the Oste-class SIGINT/ELINT and reconnaissance ships
  931st Electronic Warfare Battalion
  932nd Electronic Warfare Battalion, provides airborne troops for operations in enemy territory
  Bundeswehr Strategic Reconnaissance School
 Bundeswehr Operational Communications Center
 Cyber-Operations Center
 Electronic Warfare Analysis Center
 Central Imaging Reconnaissance, operating the SAR-Lupe satellites
  Central Bundeswehr Investigation Authority for Technical Reconnaissance

References 

Joint Support Service (Germany)
Information operations units and formations
Military units and formations established in 2002
Military intelligence agencies
2002 establishments in Germany
Military intelligence units and formations
German intelligence agencies